Nervous Brickdown  is a Breakout clone video game developed by the French team Arkedo Studio and published by Eidos Interactive for Nintendo DS in 2007.

Game modes
The game features three different modes: Arcade, which is a succession of levels set in 10 different worlds; Multi, which allows up to two players to play the game together, and Shuffle, which chooses five levels randomly for the player to play.

Reception

The game received "average" reviews according to the review aggregation website Metacritic. In Japan, where the game was ported and published by Success on January 24, 2008, Famitsu gave it a score of two eights, one seven, and one six for a total of 29 out of 40.

Notes

 Known in Japan as

References

External links
  Arkedo website
An interview conducted by a French video game journalist during the development of Nervous Brickdown (French)

Official website (Japanese)

2007 video games
Breakout clones
Eidos Interactive games
Multiplayer and single-player video games
Nintendo DS games
Nintendo DS-only games
Success (company) games
Video games developed in France
Arkedo Studio games